Rockefeller Institute may refer to:

The Rockefeller Institute of Government
Rockefeller University, previously known as The Rockefeller Institute for Medical Research